Showground or Showgrounds railway station may refer to one of three stations:

 Adelaide Showground railway station, current station in Adelaide
 Hills Showground railway station, a Sydney Metro station
 Showground Central railway station, former station in Adelaide that served Adelaide Showground
 Showgrounds railway station, Melbourne, serves the Melbourne Showground
 Showgrounds railway station, Perth, serves the Claremont Showgrounds